CATCO (formerly known as the Contemporary American Theatre Company) is a regional professional theatre company in Columbus, Ohio. Operating under an Actors' Equity SPT 3+ contract, it produces a five- to six-show season that commonly runs from October through June and consists of contemporary, classic, and new works.

In January 1985, founding artistic director Geoffrey Nelson financed a production of Bill C. Davis's Mass Appeal at the YWCA under the company name Columbus Theatre Project. In 1986, CATCO was incorporated as a non-profit and the company converted a warehouse on Park Street in the Short North to a theatre. The Park Street location remained CATCO's home until 1997 when CATCO became a resident theatre company in the Vern Riffe Center for Government and the Arts in downtown Columbus.

CATCO produces an annual playwriting fellowship. According to the company's 2017 call for submissions, "Playwrights who are Franklin County residents will be given preference, but any author may submit his/her work."

Key staff
Steven C. Anderson - Producing Director
Geoffrey Nelson – Artistic Director Emeritus
Joe Bishara– Associate Producing Director

Notable productions
 The Last Smoker in America
The Santaland Diaries
The Exonerated
The Pillowman
"The Story of my Life"
"Evil Dead: The Musical"
"Forbidden Broadway's Greatest Hits: Volume One"
"Dirty Rotten Scoundrels"
"Master Class"

External links
Contemporary American Theatre Company Official Website

References

Regional theatre in the United States
Theatrical organizations in the United States
Theatre companies in Columbus, Ohio